Derek Michael Chauvin (born March 19, 1976) is an American former police officer, who was convicted of murdering George Floyd, a 46-year-old African-American man, in Minneapolis, Minnesota. Chauvin was a member of the Minneapolis Police Department from 2001 to 2020.

Chauvin knelt on Floyd's neck for about nine minutes while Floyd was handcuffed and lying face down on the street, calling out "I can't breathe", during an arrest made with three other officers on May 25, 2020. Chauvin was dismissed by the Minneapolis Police Department (MPD) on May 26 and arrested on May 29. The murder set off a series of protests in the Twin Cities and across the rest of the United States, later spreading around the world.

In his career, Chauvin had 18 complaints against him on official record and was involved in three police shootings, one of which was fatal. On October 29, 2006, he was involved in the killing of an Ojibwe, Wayne Reyes, by 23 gunshots. In the early morning of May 24, 2008, Chauvin almost killed unarmed Ira Latrell Toles by beating and twice shooting him. On August 8, 2011, Chauvin was put on a three-day leave for his involvement in the shooting of Leroy Martinez, who was not armed. In 2017, Chauvin hit a 14-year-old black boy in the head with a flashlight, then held him down with his knee for almost 17 minutes, ignoring the boy's complaints that he could not breathe.

On March 8, 2021, Chauvin was put on trial for unintentional second-degree murder, third-degree murder, and second-degree manslaughter of Floyd before a jury in the Minnesota Fourth Judicial District Court.  On April 20, he was convicted of the charges.  On June 25, he was sentenced to  years in prison (minus the 199 days' time served), with the possibility of supervised release contingent on factors such as good behavior after two-thirds of his sentence (the sentence before any deductions of time), or 15 years for this second-degree murder conviction.

In December 2021, Chauvin pled guilty to federal charges of violating Floyd's civil rights by using unreasonable force and ignoring Floyd's serious medical needs. Simultaneously, Chauvin pled guilty to violating a 14-year-old boy's civil rights in 2017 by using unreasonable force. On July 7, 2022, Chauvin was sentenced to 21 years in prison for violating Floyd's civil rights. The federal and state sentences are to run concurrently. The Minnesota Department of Corrections lists Chauvin's anticipated release date on the state sentence as December 10, 2035.

Early life and education
Chauvin was born in Oakdale, Minnesota, on March 19, 1976. His mother was a housewife and his father was a certified public accountant. During his early years, Chauvin grew up in West Saint Paul. When he was seven, his parents divorced and were granted joint custody of him.

Chauvin attended Park High School in Cottage Grove, Minnesota, but did not finish and later obtained a GED certificate in 1994. He earned a certificate in quantity food preparation at Dakota County Technical College and worked jobs as a prep cook at a McDonald's in Cottage Grove and later at a Tincunni's buffet restaurant in neighboring Newport. He served in the United States Army Reserve from 1996 to 2004, including two stints in the military police between 1996 and 2000 (first in Rochester, Minnesota, and later Hohenfels, Bavaria in Germany). During that time, he also attended Inver Hills Community College from 1995 to 1999 and later transferred to Metropolitan State University where he graduated with a bachelor's degree in law enforcement in 2006.

Career
Chauvin applied to the Minneapolis Police Department (MPD) in September 2000 and joined the MPD in 2001. While on the force he was involved in three police shootings, one of which was fatal. He received a medal for valor in 2006 for being one of several officers who fired 23 shots on Wayne Reyes who pointed a shotgun at them, and another in 2008 for a domestic violence incident in which he broke down a door and shot Ira Latrell Toles who allegedly reached for his pistol. He received a commendation medal in 2008 after he and his partner tackled a fleeing suspect holding a pistol. In 2009, Chauvin received another commendation medal after working off duty as a security guard for a nightclub.

Misconduct complaints
Chauvin had 18 complaints on his official record, two of which ended in discipline, including official letters of reprimand.

On October 29, 2006, he was involved in the killing of Native American Wayne Reyes, who pointed a shotgun at them, by 23 gunshots.

On May 24, 2008, Chauvin was responding to a domestic violence call about 21-year-old black man Ira Latrell Toles by the mother of his baby. He broke down the bathroom door and nearly killed unarmed Toles by beating him with his pistol and then shooting him twice at close range after he allegedly reached for an officers gun.

On August 8, 2011, Chauvin was involved in the shooting of 23-year-old Alaskan Native American man Leroy Martinez in the torso by fellow officer Terry Nutter. Eyewitness accounts contradicted the police's claim that Martinez was armed when he was shot. According to them and Martinez himself he had already dropped his gun and held his arms in the air but the police shot him nonetheless. The three officers returned to work after a standard three-day administrative leave. After investigating the incident, the then Minneapolis Police Chief Timothy Dolan stated that the police officers acted "appropriately and courageously".

On September 4, 2017, Chauvin was among officers responding to a complaint by the mother of two young children. Videos from the scene were said to show Chauvin hitting a 14-year-old black boy in the head with a flashlight so hard he required stitches, then holding him down with his knee for nearly 17 minutes, ignoring the boy's complaints that he could not breathe. Trying to avoid prejudice in the Floyd trial, the judge prohibited the prosecutors from raising the matter.

According to the former owner of El Nuevo Rodeo, a Latin nightclub, Chauvin had worked there off duty as security while George Floyd was also working as security, but was not certain whether they knew each other. The owner has been critical of Chauvin since his arrest, describing Chauvin's tactics as "overkill" and saying "Chauvin was unnecessarily aggressive on nights when the club had a black clientele, quelling fights by dousing the crowd with pepper spray and calling in several police squad cars as backup".

Murder of George Floyd

On May 25, 2020, Chauvin was one of four officers involved in arresting George Floyd on suspicion of using a counterfeit $20 bill at a market and was the field training officer for one of the other officers involved. Security camera footage from a nearby business did not show Floyd resisting the arrest. The criminal complaint stated that, based on body camera footage, Floyd repeatedly said he could not breathe while standing outside the police car, resisted getting in the car and fell down; he went to the ground face down. While Floyd was handcuffed and lying face down on the street, Chauvin knelt on Floyd's neck for more than nine minutes. After Chauvin placed his knee on Floyd's neck, Floyd repeatedly said "I can't breathe", "Mama", and "please". For part of the time, two other officers knelt on Floyd's back. During the final two minutes Floyd was motionless and had no pulse. Several bystanders took videos which were widely circulated and broadcast.

Chauvin and the other officers involved were fired the day following the incident. While knee-to-neck restraints are allowed in Minnesota under certain circumstances, Chauvin's use of the technique has been widely criticized by law enforcement experts as excessive. On June 23, Minneapolis Police Chief Medaria Arradondo said that Chauvin had been trained in the dangers of positional asphyxiation and characterized Floyd's death as murder.

Arrest and charges

Chauvin was arrested on May 29, 2020. Hennepin County Attorney Mike Freeman charged him with third-degree murder, and the lesser included offense of second-degree manslaughter, making him the first white police officer in Minnesota to be charged in the death of a black civilian. Under Minnesota law, third-degree murder is defined as causing another's death without intent to kill, but "evincing a depraved mind, without regard for human life". Second-degree manslaughter also does not imply lethal intent, but that the perpetrator created "an unreasonable risk" of serious harm or death.

On May 31, Minnesota Attorney General Keith Ellison took over the case at the request of Governor Tim Walz. On June 3, Ellison amended the charges against Chauvin to include unintentional second-degree murder under the felony murder doctrine, alleging that Chauvin killed Floyd in the course of committing assault in the third degree; Minnesota sentencing guidelines recommend  years' imprisonment on conviction of that charge. Bail for Chauvin was set at $1.25 million. Prior to Chauvin's arrest, his attorney and prosecutors had made unsuccessful attempts to negotiate a plea bargain to cover both state and federal charges. Additionally, Ellison also charged the three other officers with aiding and abetting second-degree murder with bail set to $1 million.

Pre-trial
Chauvin was released on conditional bail on October 7, 2020, after posting a bond of $1 million. On October 22, 2020, Hennepin County Judge Peter Cahill dismissed the third-degree murder charge, but also denied Chauvin's motion to dismiss the other, more serious murder charges. On November 5, 2020, Judge Cahill ruled that Chauvin and all three of the others charged would be tried together in Hennepin County.

However, on January 13, 2021, Judge Cahill reversed his earlier ruling, deciding that Chauvin would be tried separately from the other three officers. On March 11, 2021, Cahill reinstated the third-degree murder charge against Chauvin.

Trial 

Chauvin's trial began on March 8, 2021, at the Hennepin County Government Center. It marked the first time that a judge in Minnesota authorized cameras to show a full criminal trial. On April 20, 2021, a jury, consisting of six white people and six people of color, found Chauvin guilty on three counts: unintentional second-degree murder, third-degree murder, and second-degree manslaughter. He was the first white Minnesotan police officer to be convicted of murdering a black person. It was only the second time an officer has been convicted of murder in Minnesota, the first being the third-degree murder conviction of Somali-American officer Mohamed Noor in the killing of Justine Damond, a white woman.

Following his conviction, Judge Cahill agreed to accept a prosecution motion to revoke Chauvin's bail and Chauvin was taken back into police custody.

Appeal 

Chauvin appealed his second-degree murder conviction and requested a public defender to represent him on appeal. The Minnesota Supreme Court denied Chauvin's request for a public defender, ruling that his financial state rendered him ineligible. Chauvin later hired attorney William Mohrman to represent him. 

On April 24, 2022, Chauvin filed an appeal to the Minnesota Court of Appeals, asking the court to reverse his conviction, and remand an order for a new trial, in a new venue, and re-sentencing, claiming that the jury of the case in the state had been "intimidated by excessive pre-trial publicity". Chauvin's lawyer further stated that the settlement reached between the city of Minneapolis and the Floyd family for $27 million during jury selection amounted to prejudice.

Imprisonment 
Following his conviction, Chauvin's bail was revoked and he was remanded into custody by the Hennepin County Sheriff's Office, which transferred him to the Minnesota Department of Corrections. He was then booked into the Oak Park Heights prison, where he was previously incarcerated following his 2020 arrest.

At Oak Parks, Chauvin was held in solitary confinement for 23 hours a day in an isolated wing of the prison, where he was under constant watch "for fears for his safety". Chauvin was held at Oak Park Heights until his sentencing hearing on June 25, 2021. On May 12, 2021, Hennepin County District Judge Peter Cahill allowed for the prosecution to seek a greater prison sentence after finding that Chauvin treated Floyd "with particular cruelty".

On June 3, 2021, it was reported that the prosecution was seeking a sentence of 30 years' imprisonment for Chauvin based on the extreme cruelty he exhibited when he murdered Floyd, which opposed any human conscience of society and thus a harsh punishment should be warranted. Chauvin pleaded to not be incarcerated, and instead sought probation for causing the death of Floyd while exceeding his moral duties as an officer. On June 25, 2021, Chauvin was sentenced to  years in prison (minus the 199 days of credit he received) on the second-degree murder charge, while the second-degree manslaughter and third-degree murder charges remain not adjudicated. The earliest Chauvin could be eligible for release on parole would be in 2035 or 2036, when he will be close to 60 years old. Under Chauvin's federal plea agreement, he will serve his state and federal sentences concurrently and be subject to five years of parole after release. According to the Federal Bureau of Prisons he is scheduled for release on November 18, 2038.

On August 24, 2022, Chauvin was transferred from Oak Park Heights prison, a Minnesota Department of Corrections facility, to FCI Tucson in Arizona, a federal facility.

Civil rights violations case

The United States Department of Justice (DOJ) convened a grand jury in February 2021 to investigate whether Chauvin violated Floyd's civil rights as well as another incident in September 2017 when Chauvin restrained a 14-year-old boy for several minutes, using his knee to lean into the boy's back and hitting him with a flashlight several times.

During the restraint, Chauvin ignored the boy's pleas that he could not breathe and the boy briefly lost consciousness. The 2017 incident was deemed inadmissible as evidence in Chauvin's murder trial. Following Chauvin's murder conviction, the investigation was still underway, with the DOJ reportedly weighing whether to bring criminal charges against Chauvin for the 2017 incident.

Federal investigators planned to charge Chauvin and the other three officers for federal civil rights violations, and intended to ask the grand jury to indict him for both the 2017 and 2020 incidents. These indictments caused the state court trial for the three other officers to be pushed back to start on March 7, 2022, from August 23, 2021. Chauvin, also on May 7, 2021, was also indicted by the same grand jury for violating the civil rights of the 14-year-old boy he arrested in the aforementioned September 2017 incident. The federal charges will be prosecuted by DOJ attorneys in Minnesota and Washington, D.C.

On September 16, 2021, Chauvin pleaded not guilty to the charges related to the 2017 incident indictment.

Guilty plea 
In December 2021, Chauvin requested a hearing to offer a revised plea to the federal charges. He pled guilty on December 15, 2021, to federal charges of violating the rights of Floyd, and violating the rights of the 14-year-old in the 2017 incident.

Chauvin admitted for the first time that he willfully violated Floyd's constitutional right to be free from unreasonable seizure, which includes the right to be free from the use of unreasonable force by a police officer, by continuously kneeling on Floyd’s neck even though Floyd was handcuffed and not resisting at the time. Chauvin also admitted willfully violating Floyd's constitutional right not to be deprived of liberty without due process of law, including the right to be free from a police officer's deliberate indifference to Floyd's serious medical needs.

In the 2017 case incident, in which Chauvin had grabbed a 14-year-old by the throat, hit the 14-year-old in the head with a flashlight, and kneeled on the 14-year-old's neck and upper back despite the 14-year-old being prone, handcuffed, and not resisting, Chauvin admitted violating the 14-year old's constitutional right to be free from the unreasonable force by a police officer.

According to the Wall Street Journal, a plea deal was reached whereby federal prosecutors would request a 300-month (25-year) sentence to be served concurrently with the State of Minnesota sentence instead of the maximum life in prison.

On May 4, 2022, the judge presiding the federal case accepted the plea deal, paving the way for a sentence of between 20 and 25 years in prison, to be served concurrently with his state sentence.

On July 7, 2022, Chauvin was sentenced to 21 years in prison on the charges of violating the civil rights of George Floyd and the boy.

Tax evasion charges
On July 22, 2020, after he was charged with murder, Chauvin and his wife, Kellie, were separately charged in Washington County, Minnesota, with nine counts of felony tax evasion related to allegedly fraudulent state income tax returns from 2014 to 2019. Prosecutors said the couple had under-reported their joint income by $464,433, including more than $95,000 from Chauvin's security work. The complaint also alleges failure to pay proper sales tax on a $100,000 BMW purchased in Minnesota in 2018, failure to declare income from Chauvin's wife's business, and improper deductions for a rental home.

Chauvin first appeared in Washington County District Court for his tax-evasion case (number 82-CR-20-2813) on September 8, 2021. The pre-trial hearing was scheduled for January 21, 2022. Chauvin pleaded guilty on March 17, 2023, and was sentenced to 13 months in prison, to run concurrently with his murder sentence.

Ramsey County Jail discrimination complaint 
Following his arrest on May 29, Chauvin was booked and processed at the Ramsey County Jail.  In June 2020, eight correctional officers who work at the jail filed a discrimination complaint against their supervisors with the Minnesota Department of Human Rights.  They alleged that during Chauvin's brief stay before his transfer to a state prison, non-white guards were not allowed to work on the fifth floor where Chauvin was being held. The complaint also alleged that a guard had witnessed a white lieutenant sit on Chauvin's bed and that she permitted Chauvin to use her cellphone. Responding to the complaint, the Minnesota Department of Human Rights said that it was opening an investigation to determine whether discrimination took place.

Following a complaint that their charge never gained traction, in February 2021 the Star Tribune reported that the group pursued legal action and filed discrimination charges with the state Department of Human Rights.  Their attorney said that his clients sued to hold Superintendent Steve Lydon and Ramsey County "responsible for the discrimination that occurred under their watch." The suit alleges the officers were informed that they would be reassigned because of Chauvin's arrival.  One of the plaintiffs said that while he regularly processed and booked high-profile inmates, he was in the middle of patting down Chauvin when the superintendent told him to stop and replaced him with a white officer.  The attorney for the group said that they felt "deeply humiliated and distressed" due to the discrimination they had experienced.  The suit also says two other officers saw security camera footage that showed that a white female lieutenant "was granted special access" wherein she sat on Chauvin's bed and patted his back "while appearing to comfort him" and let Chauvin use a cellphone.  In a statement provided to the Star Tribune by the sheriff's office, Lydon said he "was trying to 'protect and support' minority employees by shielding them from Chauvin."

Personal life
Chauvin's ex-wife, Kellie, a real-estate agent, radiologist, and photographer, is a Hmong refugee from Laos, who won the "Mrs. Minnesota" beauty pageant in 2018. She filed for divorce the day before he was arrested for Floyd's murder, and the divorce was finalized in February 2021. She has two children from a previous marriage.

Chauvin was registered to vote in Florida, where he and his wife had a second home in Windermere, as a Republican.

References

Further reading

External links 
 Minnesota v. Chauvin, no. 27-CR-20-12646 (Minn. Dist. Ct. June 25, 2021) (sentencing memorandum) 
 United States v. Chauvin, no.  21-CR-108 (United States Dist. Ct., Dist. of Minn. December 15, 2021) (plea agreement and sentencing stipulations) 

1976 births
20th-century American military personnel
21st-century American criminals
21st-century American military personnel
American male criminals
American people convicted of manslaughter
American police officers convicted of murder
Criminals from Minnesota
People convicted of murder by Minnesota
Living people
Metropolitan State University alumni
Military personnel from Minnesota
Minneapolis Police Department officers
Minnesota Republicans
Murder of George Floyd
People from Oakdale, Minnesota
United States Army reservists
People convicted of murder by the United States federal government
People convicted of depriving others of their civil rights